The Caripi River is a river of the state of Pará, Brazil. It is a left tributary of the Maracanã River.

Course

The Caripi River is the main tributary of the Maracanã River, which it enters from the left.
The lower reaches of the river are protected by the  Maracanã Marine Extractive Reserve, created in 2002.

Environment

The river is mainly surrounded by forest.
The region has a relatively low population, with 43 people per square kilometer.

See also
List of rivers of Pará

References

Sources

Rivers of Pará